Johnny Lewis (1983–2012) was an American actor.

Johnny Lewis may also refer to:
Johnny Lewis (baseball) (1939–2018), baseball player, coach, scout, and manager 
Johnny Lewis (boxing trainer) (born 1944), Australian boxing trainer
Johnny Lewis (footballer) (1901–1973), Australian rules footballer
Johnny Lewis (DJ) (born 1958), English disc jockey

See also
Johnnie Lewis (1946–2015), Liberian judge and politician
John Lewis (disambiguation)